One of the best-known arts of the Mapuche is their textiles. The tradition of Mapuche textile production dates back to pre-Hispanic times and continues up to this day. Prior to the 20th century Mapuche textiles and ponchos in particular were important trade items.

History
In Andean societies, textiles had a great importance. They were developed to be used as clothing, as tool and shelter for the home, as well as a status symbol.  In the Araucanía region in the sixteenth and seventeenth centuries, as reported by various chroniclers of Chile, the Mapuche worked to have Hispanic clothing and fabrics included as a trophy of war in treaties with the Spanish. They dressed their dead in their best clothes and finest textiles for their funerals.

The oldest data on textiles in the southernmost areas of the American continent (southern Chile and Argentina today) are found in some archaeological excavations, such as those of Pitrén Cemetery near the city of Temuco, and the Alboyanco site in the Biobío Region, both of Chile; and the Rebolledo Arriba Cemetery in Neuquén Province (Argentina). researchers have found evidence of fabrics made with complex techniques and designs, dated to between AD 1300-1350.

The oldest historical documents that refer to textile art among the indigenous peoples of southern Chilean and Argentine territory, date from the sixteenth century and consist of chronicles of European explorers and settlers. These accounts say that at the time of European arrival in the region of the Araucanía, local natives wore textiles made with camel's hair (alpaca and llamas), which they had made from the fur of these animals. Later, after the Spanish introduced sheep, the Indians began breeding these animals and using their wool for their weaving. Gradually it replaced the use of camelid hair. By the end of the sixteenth century, the indigenous people had bred sheep with more robust bodies and thicker and longer wool than those imported by the Europeans. These new breeds were better suited to local conditions.

Production
The Mapuche women were responsible for spinning and weaving. Knowledge of both weaving techniques and textile patterns particular to the locality were usually transmitted within the family, with mothers, grandmothers, and aunts teaching a girl the skills they had learned from their own elders. Women who excelled in the textile arts were highly honored for their accomplishments and contributed economically and culturally to their kinship group. A measure of the importance of weaving is evident in the expectation that a man give a larger dowry for a bride who was an accomplished weaver.

Trade
In addition, the Mapuche used their textiles as an important surplus and an exchange trading good. Numerous 16th-century accounts describe their bartering the textiles with other indigenous peoples, and with colonists in newly developed settlements. Such trading enabled the Mapuche to obtain those goods that they did not produce or held in high esteem, such as horses. Tissue volumes made by Aboriginal women and marketed in the Araucanía and the north of the Patagonia Argentina were really considerable and constitute a vital economic resource for indigenous families. The production of fabrics in the time before European settlement was clearly intended for uses beyond domestic consumption. 19th century Mapuche ponchos were clearly superior to non-indigenous Chilean textiles and of good quality when comparing to contemporary European wool textiles. According to reports of the time a poncho could be traded for several horses or up to seventy kilos of yerba mate.

Current use and production
At present, the fabrics woven by the Mapuche continue to be used for domestic purposes, as well as for gift, sale or barter. Most Mapuche women and their families now wear garments with foreign designs and tailored with materials of industrial origin, but they continue to weave ponchos, blankets, bands and belts for regular use. Many of the fabrics are woven for trade, and in many cases, are an important source of income for families.

Many Mapuche women continue to weave fabrics according to the customs of their ancestors and transmit their knowledge in the same way: within domestic life, from mother to daughter, and from grandmothers to granddaughters. This form of learning is based on gestural imitation, and only rarely, and when strictly necessary, the apprentice receives explicit instructions or help from their instructors. Knowledge is transmitted as fabric is woven, the weaving and transmission of knowledge go together.

References

Bibliography
 Alvarado, Margarita (2002) “El esplendor del adorno: El poncho y el chanuntuku” En: Hijos del Viento, Arte de los Pueblos del Sur, Siglo XIX. Buenos Aires: Fundación PROA.
 Brugnoli, Paulina y Hoces de la Guardia, Soledad (1995). “Estudio de fragmentos del sitio Alboyanco”. En: Hombre y Desierto, una perspectiva cultural, 9: 375–381.
 Garavaglia, Juan Carlos (1986). “Los textiles de la tierra en el contexto colonial rioplatense: ¿una revolución industrial fallida?”. En: Anuario IEHS, 1:45-87.
 Joseph, Claude (1931). Los tejidos Araucanos. Santiago de Chile: Imprenta San Francisco, Padre Las Casas.
 Mendez, Patricia (2009a). “Herencia textil, identidad indígena y recursos económicos en la Patagonia Argentina”. En: Revista de la Asociación de Antropólogos Iberoamericanos en Red, 4, 1:11-53.
 Méndez, Patricia (2009b). “Los tejidos indígenas en la Patagonia Argentina: cuatro siglos de comercio textilI”. En: Anuario INDIANA, 26: 233-265.
 Murra, John (1975). Formaciones económicas y políticas del mundo andino. Lima: Instituto de Estudios Peruanos.
 Palermo, Miguel Angel (1994). “Economía y mujer en el sur argentino”. En: Memoria Americana 3: 63-90.
 Wilson, Angélica (1992). Arte de Mujeres. Santiago de Chile: Ed. CEDEM, Colección Artes y Oficios Nº 3.

Textile arts of the Andes
Latin American art
Pre-Columbian art
Indigenous textile art of the Americas
Textiles